Jaime Galarza Zavala (born July 28, 1930 in Cuenca) is an Ecuadorian writer, poet, journalist and politician.

He has published over 20 books, including books of poetry and the following non-fiction books: El yugo feudal, El festín del petróleo, Piratas del golfo, Los Campesinos de Loja y Zamora, Petróleo de nuestra muerte, Quienes mataron a Roldós.

He was Ecuador's the first person to hold a Cabinet post as Minister of the Environment.

In 2007, he was awarded the Ecuadorian national prize Premio Eugenio Espejo by the President of Ecuador.

References 

1930 births
Ecuadorian male writers
Ecuadorian poets
Ecuadorian journalists
Male journalists
People from Cuenca, Ecuador
Living people
Environment ministers of Ecuador